Hippocephala is a genus of beetles in the family Cerambycidae, containing the following species:

subgenus Hippocephala
 Hippocephala argentistriata Holzschuh, 2006
 Hippocephala dimorpha Gressitt, 1937
 Hippocephala lineaticollis Pic, 1924
 Hippocephala lineolata Aurivillius, 1926
 Hippocephala minor Pic, 1927
 Hippocephala proxima Breuning, 1940
 Hippocephala suturalis Aurivillius, 1920

subgenus Mimosmermus
 Hippocephala albosuturalis Breuning, 1954
 Hippocephala fuscolineata Breuning, 1947
 Hippocephala fuscostriata Breuning, 1940

subgenus incertae sedis
 Hippocephala guangdongensis Hua, 1991

References

Agapanthiini